This is intended to be a complete list of the properties and districts on the National Register of Historic Places in Wright County, Iowa, United States. Latitude and longitude coordinates are provided for many National Register properties and districts; these locations may be seen together in a map.

There are 8 properties and districts listed on the National Register in the county, including one National Historic Landmark.  Two properties were formerly listed on the National Register.

|}

Former listings

|}

See also

 List of National Historic Landmarks in Iowa
 National Register of Historic Places listings in Iowa
 Listings in neighboring counties: Franklin, Hamilton, Hancock, Hardin, Humboldt, Webster

References

Wright

Buildings and structures in Wright County, Iowa